Amli is a census town in the Union Territory of Dadra & Nagar Haveli and Daman and Diu in India.

Geography
It has an average elevation of 26 metres (85 feet).

Demographics
 India census, Amli had a population of 28,566. Males constitute 39% of the population and females 61%. Amli has an average literacy rate of 70%, higher than the national average of 59.5%. About 15% of the population is under 6 years of age.

References

Cities and towns in Dadra and Nagar Haveli